Cidade Jardim is a train station on ViaMobilidade Line 9-Emerald, located in the district of Pinheiros in São Paulo. It is next to São Paulo Jockey Club and Pinheiros Sport Club.

History
The station was built by CPTM, during the "South Line Dinamization" and opened on 30 June 2000, being projected by architect Luiz Carlos Esteves in 1994.

References

Railway stations opened in 2000
2000 establishments in Brazil